= Mercseum =

Mercseum (from "Mercedes" and "Museum") is a private collection of post-war Mercedes-Benz vehicles located close to Cape Town, in South Africa.

The collection, which includes Mercedes-Benz models from 1950 to 2010, was started by South African advocate and Mercedes-Benz enthusiast Graham van Heerden. Van Heerden was the president of the Mercedes-Benz Club of South Africa as well as editor of Benz Lens from 2012 to 2015.
